David Petraeus (born 1952) is a retired United States Army general.

Petraeus may also refer to:

Mythology
Petraeus (mythology)

People
 Aeschillus Petraeus (1593–1657), Bishop of Turku in 1652–1657
 Heinrich Petraeus (1589–1620), German physician and writer
 Holly Petraeus (born 1952), wife of David Petraeus

Species
Petraeus, from Latin growing with rocks, is a species name. It may be found in the Latin name of the following species:

 Cancer petraeus, a crab species that lives in the Indo-Pacific, from Hawaii to the Red Sea and South Africa
 Nyctibatrachus petraeus, a frog species endemic to India
 Plethodon petraeus, the Pigeon Mountain salamander, a salamander species endemic to southeastern North America

See also
 Petraea (disambiguation)